Epitonioidea is a superfamily of planktonic and ectoparasitic sea snails, marine gastropod molluscs within the informal group Ptenoglossa. This superfamily includes the wentletraps and the purple snails.

Taxonomy
Families and subfamilies within this superfamily are as follows:

Family Epitoniidae S.S. Berry, 1910, the wentletraps
Family Janthinidae Lamarck, 1822, the purple snails
Family Nystiellidae Clench & Turner, 1952

References

Ptenoglossa